Persicoptila is a genus of moths in the family Cosmopterigidae.

Species
Persicoptila acrostigma  
Persicoptila aesthetica  
Persicoptila anthomima  
Persicoptila anthophyes  
Persicoptila aquilifera  
Persicoptila arenosa Turner, 1917
Persicoptila chiasta  
Persicoptila dasysceles Turner, 1917
Persicoptila erythrota  
Persicoptila eurytricha  
Persicoptila haemanthes  
Persicoptila heliatma  
Persicoptila heroica  
Persicoptila hesperis Meyrick, 1897
Persicoptila leucosarca  
Persicoptila libanotris  
Persicoptila meliteucta  
Persicoptila mimochora Meyrick, 1897
Persicoptila oenosceles Turner, 1917
Persicoptila oriaula  
Persicoptila peltias Meyrick, 1897
Persicoptila petrinopa  
Persicoptila phoenoxantha  
Persicoptila phronimopis  
Persicoptila picrodes  
Persicoptila ramulosa  
Persicoptila rhipidaspis  
Persicoptila rhodocnemis Meyrick, 1915
Persicoptila scholarcha  
Persicoptila tritozona Turner, 1917
Persicoptila vinosa

References
Natural History Museum Lepidoptera genus database

Cosmopteriginae